622 Esther is a minor planet orbiting the Sun.

The asteroid is named after the biblical figure Esther.

In 2001, the asteroid was detected by radar from the Arecibo Observatory at a distance of 1.11 AU.

References

External links 
 
 

000622
Discoveries by Joel Hastings Metcalf
Named minor planets
000622
000622
19061113